Maude Elizabeth Seymour Abbott (March 18, 1868 – September 2, 1940) was a Canadian physician, among Canada's earliest female medical graduates, and an internationally known expert on congenital heart disease. She was one of the first women to obtain a BA from McGill University.

Early life and education
Maude Elizabeth Seymour Babin was born in St. Andrews East, on 18 March 1868. Both of her parents were absent during infancy, as her mother had died of tuberculosis when Abbott was 7 months old and her father had abandoned her and her older sister, Alice. The two sisters were legally adopted and raised by their maternal grandmother, Mrs. William Abbott, who was then 62. She was a cousin of John Abbott, Canada's third Prime Minister.

Abbott was home schooled until she was 15 years old. In 1885, she graduated from a private Montreal seminary high school.

Abbott was admitted to McGill University's Faculty of Arts, with a scholarship, even though she had previously been rejected, and received her BA in 1890, graduating as class valedictorian and receiving the Lord Stanley Gold Medal. She subsequently applied to study medicine at McGill University. Admission was refused despite petitioning the faculty first privately and then publicly as the medical school administration was adamant in their refusal to accept a woman. She was then accepted into medical school at Bishop's University and while there, was able to undertake clinical training at the Montreal General Hospital alongside medical students from McGill. In 1894, she received her M.D., C.M. with honours, and the only woman in her class. She received the Chancellor's Prize, and Senior Anatomy Prize for having the best final examination.

Career

Later in 1894, she opened her own practice in Montreal, worked with the Royal Victoria hospital, and was nominated and elected as the Montreal Medico-Chirurgical Society's first female member. Some time afterwards, she did her post-graduate medical studies in Vienna.

In 1897, she opened an independent clinic dedicated to treating women and children. There, she did much first-hand research in pathology. Much of Abbott's work concerned the nature of heart disease, especially in newborn babies. This would cause her to be recognized as a world authority on heart defects.

In 1898, she was appointed Assistant Curator at the McGill Pathological Museum, becoming curator 1901.

In 1905, she was invited to write the chapter on 'Congenital Heart Disease' for William Osler's  System of Modern Medicine. He declared it "the best thing he had ever read on the subject." The article would place her as the world authority in the field of congenital heart disease.

In 1906, she co-founded the International Association of Medical Museums, with Osler. She became its international secretary in 1907. She would edit the institutions articles for thirty-one years (1907-1938).

In 1910, Abbott was awarded an honorary medical degree from McGill and was made a lecturer in Pathology; this was eight years prior to the university admitting female students to the Faculty of Medicine. After a much conflict with Dr. Horst Oërtel, she left McGill to take up a position at the Women's Medical College of Pennsylvania in 1923. In 1925, Abbott returned to McGill becoming an Assistant Professor.

In 1924, she was a founder of the Federation of Medical Women of Canada, a Canadian organization committed to the professional, social and personal advancement of women physicians.

In 1936, she wrote the Atlas of Congenital Cardiac Disease. The work illustrated a new classification system and described records of over a thousand cases of clinical and postmortem records. The same year she retired from her professorial position.

Abbott was a prolific writer, composing over 140 papers and books. She also gave countless lectures.

Death and legacy
On 2 September 1940, Abbott died from a brain hemorrhage, in Montreal.

In 1943, Diego Rivera painted her in his mural for the National Institute of Cardiology of Mexico City. She was the only Canadian, and the only woman depicted in the work.

In 1958, the International Academy of Pathology established the 'Maude Abbott Lecture'.

In 1993, she was named a "Historic Person" by the Historic Sites and Monuments Board of Canada and a plaque was erected outside the McIntyre Medical Sciences Building at McGill University in Montreal.

In 1994, she was posthumously inducted into the Canadian Medical Hall of Fame. In 2000, a bronze plaque was erected in her honour on the McIntyre Medical Building. In the same year, Canada Post issued a forty-six cent postage stamp entitled The Heart of the Matter in her honour.

McGill University Health Centre has also recognized Abbott by naming their congenital heart defect clinic the “Maude Clinic”. The clinic has carried her name proudly for many years - originally at the Royal Victoria Hospital site and now continuing at the new M.U.H.C. Glen site.

Awards and honours
 Chancellor's Prize, 1894.
 Senior Anatomy Prize, 1894.
 Lord Stanley Gold Medal, 1890.
 McGill class valedictorian, 1890.

Selected works
 The Atlas of Congenital Cardiac Disease (Originally published  in New York by the American Heart Association in 1936. A reprint was published by McGill-Queen's University Press in 2006 in commemoration of the 100th anniversary of the founding of the International Academy of Pathology."
 
 
 
 
 
 
 
 
 
 "An early Canadian biologist, Michel Sarrazin (1659–1735))—His life and times". In: . 1928 Nov; 19(5): 600–607, p. 600–607—A review of Arthur Vallée's "Un biologiste canadien, Michel Sarrazin (1659–1739). Sa vie, ses travaux, et son temps"

See also
 List of pathologists

Notes

References

Further reading

External links
Video on Maude Abbott by the Canadian Medical Hall of Fame
Maude Abbott Collection at the Osler Library of the History of Medicine, Montreal.

1868 births
1940 deaths
19th-century Canadian physicians
20th-century Canadian physicians
Anglophone Quebec people
Bishop's University alumni
Canadian adoptees
Canadian women physicians
McGill University alumni
Academic staff of McGill University
Canadian pathologists
Persons of National Historic Significance (Canada)
People from Laurentides
20th-century women physicians
19th-century women physicians
20th-century Canadian women scientists